Kovddoskaisi (Northern Sami: Govddosgáisi) is the fourth highest mountain in Finland with a summit at 1242 m (prominence 440m).

Access to the summit 

Many backpackers consider it a very hard summit to reach for its location between two valley lakes and relatively steep rise (up 600 m in 5 km) and harsh terrain.

References

See also
 Scandinavian Mountains

Mountains of Finland
Enontekiö
One-thousanders of Finland